The Cleveland mayoral election of 1971 saw the election of Ralph Perk.

This was the last officially partisan mayoral election in Cleveland. Subsequent elections have used a nonpartisan system.

Nominations
Primaries were held on September 28.

Democratic primary

Republican primary

General election

References

Mayoral elections in Cleveland
Cleveland mayoral
Cleveland
November 1971 events in the United States
1970s in Cleveland